The Monastery of Pelayos is a Cistercian monastery in a state of ruin located in Pelayos de la Presa, Community of Madrid.

History and description 
The monastery is located in the north bank of Arroyo de la Presa, close to Pelayos de la Presa's housing. Built on behalf of the Order of Cistercians, its construction dates back to the 12th century, although it underwent substantial refurbishing works starting in the 15th century. The 1836 desamortización ('ecclesial confiscation') of Mendizábal pertaining monastic properties and subsequent departure of the monks underpinned the beginning of the ruin process.

Architect  purchased the ruins and invested in their rehabilitation. In 2003, García Benito donated the monastery to the municipal corporation.

The landmark was declared Bien de Interés Cultural pursuant to a 23 November 1983 Royal Decree, published in the BOE on 14 February 1984.

Notes

References

Bibliography

External links 
 Consulta a la base de datos de bienes inmuebles on Ministerio de Cultura y Deporte website 

Monasteries in the community of Madrid
Cistercian monasteries in Spain
Bien de Interés Cultural landmarks in the Community of Madrid